Louis Svitek is an American musician and former guitarist for a number of bands including Zoetrope, M.O.D., Ministry, Pigface, Mind Funk, The Hollow steps,  Project .44, and The Joy Thieves. His work can also be found in many movie soundtracks such as The Matrix and Blue Hill Avenue.

WuLi Records
Louis Svitek and partner Ryan McGuire founded their own recording studio and independent record label, "WuLi Records", in Chicago, IL. WuLi Records is responsible for discovering Chicago's acts such as The Redd, Young Inno, The Waking, and American Idol 2010 winner Lee DeWyze. Prior to Idol, Louis Svitek was part of the Lee DeWyze Band that also included Ryan McGuire and Jeff Henderson.

References

External links
WuLi Records Official website
WuLi Records MySpace site

Mind Funk members
American rock guitarists
American male guitarists
American industrial musicians
Living people
Year of birth missing (living people)
Pigface members
Ministry (band) members
M.O.D. members